Araksia Gyulzadyan (June 5, 1907, Alexandropol – October 7, 1980, Yerevan) was an Armenian canonical singer of folk and ashugh music. She was awarded the People's Artist of Armenia honorary title in 1960.

Biography

As a young child, she became a solo singer at a church in Gyumri. She finished the primary school in her native town and moved to Yerevan in 1926, where Romanos Melikian became one of her teachers. She was the solo singer of the Armenian Radio Orchestra of Folk Instruments until 1955. She was also a solo performer at the Armenian Philharmonic.

She is also known for her performances of Sheram's songs.

Discography
Husher, 1999

References

External links
Araksia Gyulzadyan
Araksia Gyulzadyan

Biography at Armeniapedia

1907 births
1980 deaths
People from Gyumri
20th-century Armenian women singers
Soviet women singers